William Leonard Grayden  (born Wilbur Ives; 5 August 1920) is an Australian former politician. He was a member of parliament across six decades, serving in the Western Australian Legislative Assembly (1947–1949, 1956–1993) and the Australian House of Representatives (1949–1954). A World War II veteran, he served as a Liberal with the exception of a brief period as an independent. Grayden was a backbencher in federal parliament, but later held ministerial office in the state government of Charles Court (1974–1978, 1980–1982). His brother David and grandfather Nat Harper were also members of parliament.

Early life and military service
Grayden was born Wilbur Ives on 5 August 1920 in Bickley, Western Australia. He was one of three children born to Ethel May Harper and Aubrey Leonard Ives, including his younger brother David who also entered politics. Grayden's father participated in the landing at Anzac Cove on 25 April 1915, and lost a lung after being shot by a Turkish sniper. The marriage broke up and his mother gave the children their step-father's surname after she remarried. Grayden is the maternal grandson of Western Australian businessman and politician Nat Harper.

Grayden was educated at state schools and then at Perth Technical College, as part of an apprenticeship commenced in 1938 as a motor mechanic with Winterbottom Motors. He attempted to enlist in the Australian Army when the Second World War broke out in September 1939, but was rejected. He succeeded the following year after lying about his age. Grayden joined the 2/16th Infantry Battalion as a private, but was soon promoted to corporal and then selected to attend Officer Training School in Bonegilla. He served on the Syrian campaign and then in 1942 was sent to New Guinea, where he took part in the Kokoda Track campaign, the Battle of Buna–Gona, and the Markham and Ramu Valley campaign. He ended the war in Borneo and took part in the Battle of Balikpapan.

Politics
Grayden served a total of 43 years in State and Federal Parliament.

State and federal politics: 1946–1954
Grayden stood as an independent in the Division of Swan at the 1946 federal election. At the 1947 Western Australian state election, he was elected to the  Legislative Assembly as the Liberal member for Middle Swan. He was the youngest member of the parliament.

At the 1949 federal election, Grayden transferred to the Australian House of Representatives, winning the seat of Swan for the Liberals. He stated his primary interest in parliament would be defence. He was re-elected at the 1951 election but defeated by Australian Labor Party (ALP) candidate Harry Web at the 1954 election.

Grayden initiated a number of publicity stunts during his time in parliament. In October 1950 he sent whale meat from a station at Carnarvon to Canberra to be served on the parliamentary menu. In December 1950 he announced "Operation Corks", a plan to test the impact of pollution from Fremantle Harbour by dropping hundreds of coloured corks into the Swan River. In 1953 Grayden led an expedition to Central Australia seeking evidence of the lost Leichhardt expedition. It visited the area around the Rawlinson Ranges and returned with various indigenous and non-indigenous artefacts, though none linked to Leichhardt.

State politics: 1956–1993
In 1956, Grayden returned to the Legislative Assembly, winning the seat of South Perth. He stood as an unendorsed Liberal against the endorsed Liberal and Country League (LCL) candidate, and was re-elected as an "independent Liberal" at the 1959 election, again defeating an endorsed candidate. He subsequently was admitted as an LCL member.

Grayden had a strong interest in indigenous affairs. In 1956, he told parliament that the British nuclear tests at Maralinga "could mean death from sickness or starvation to 800 tribal aborigines", and that it would be difficult to warn them due to their nomadic nature. In the same year he led a parliamentary enquiry into the state of remote indigenous peoples. The resulting report by the select committee was tabled in December 1956, officially called the Report of the Select Committee appointed to Enquire into Native Welfare Conditions in the Laverton-Warburton Range Area, also known as the Grayden Report. It brought to public consciousness the dreadful plight of many of the nomadic Wongi peoples, and after newspaper publicity the affair developed into what became known as the Warburton Ranges controversy, leading to much public discussion, lobbying of both federal and state governments, and Indigenous activism. The latter contributed to a national movement campaigning for the rights of Indigenous Australians, including the formation of what is now known as Federal Council for the Advancement of Aborigines and Torres Strait Islanders (FCAATSI).

In February 1957, disappointed by the public reaction to the report, Grayden and Aboriginal pastor Douglas Nicholls returned to Ngaanyatjarra with a film camera to document the conditions. The resulting film Their Darkest Hour (also titled Manslaughter), shown at public meetings around Australia, was said to have "variously shocked and enraged audiences" and has been called "one of the earliest examples of activist documentary in Australia". Grayden also released a book of black and white photographs titled Adam and Atoms.

In 1974, Grayden was appointed Minister for Labour and Industry, Consumer Affairs, Immigration and Tourism in the government of Charles Court. In 1976 he introduced legislation that would abolish compulsory trade union membership. Grayden resigned from the ministry in 1978 following "an early-morning fracas involving two policemen in a Perth hotel", as a result of which he was convicted of assault and wilful damage. He returned to the ministry after the 1980 state election as Minister for Education, Cultural Affairs, and Recreation. Grayden was removed from the ministry in 1982 following Court's retirement and replacement by Ray O'Connor. The Canberra Times described him at the time as "the WA Parliament's stormy petrel" and noted that he expected to spend another 10 or 12 years in politics.

Grayden left the Assembly in 1993.

Later life
In 2015, aged 94, Grayden visited Gallipoli to commemorate the 100th anniversary of the landing at Anzac Cove, which his father had participated in.

Grayden is the earliest elected federal MP still alive, and he is the last surviving "Forty-Niner" MP, as well as the last surviving MP first elected before 1961. In a 2019 interview he recalled his personal memories of Robert Menzies, Ben Chifley, and Billy Hughes.

Personal life
Grayden married Betsy Marie Chadwick on 31 July 1948, with whom he had five sons and five daughters.  he had 36 grandchildren and 34 great-grandchildren, and was expecting his first great-great-grandchild. His son Jim stood as a candidate at the 2018 Perth by-election (as an independent Liberal) and the 2019 federal election (as an endorsed Liberal candidate).

References

 

1920 births
Living people
Australian Army officers
Australian Army personnel of World War II
Liberal Party of Australia members of the Parliament of Australia
Liberal Party of Australia members of the Parliament of Western Australia
Members of the Australian House of Representatives for Swan
Members of the Order of Australia
Men centenarians
Politicians from Perth, Western Australia
Members of the Western Australian Legislative Assembly
20th-century Australian politicians
Australian centenarians